The Pénélope was a 44-gun  of the French Navy.

Commissioned under Captain Bernard Dubourdieu in November 1806, Pénélope served in the Atlantic for some months.

They arrived on 28 March, having captured 12 British prizes en route, including the privateer Sirene.

On 1 January 1809, command of Pénélope was transferred to Captain Simonot. In the action of 27 February 1809, she and  captured . Pénélope later took part in the action of 5 November 1813.

Pénélope was decommissioned at the Bourbon Restoration, on 31 August 1815, and was sold for scrap in 1828.

Sources and references
 

Age of Sail frigates of France
1806 ships
Armide-class frigates
Ships built in France